Kheyrabad (also Romanized as Kheyrābād and Khairābād; also known as Kheyrābād-e Golvār, Kheyrābād-e Maīād, Kheyrābād-e Mayāgh, and Kheyrābād-e Nāmī) is a village in Band-e Amir Rural District, Zarqan District, Shiraz County, Fars Province, Iran. At the 2006 census, its population was 274, in 72 families.

References 

Populated places in Zarqan County